Henry Cumming (September 5, 1905 – July 10, 1945) was an American sprinter. He competed in the men's 200 metres at the 1928 Summer Olympics.

Cumming commissioned in 1941 as a major in the military intelligence section of the United States Army during World War II, later rising to colonel, serving abroad in Morocco and Italy, dying of polio in Florence on 10 July 1945.

References

External links
 

1905 births
1945 deaths
Athletes (track and field) at the 1928 Summer Olympics
American male sprinters
Olympic track and field athletes of the United States
Sportspeople from Augusta, Georgia
Track and field athletes from Georgia (U.S. state)
United States Army personnel killed in World War II
United States Army officers
Deaths from polio
Infectious disease deaths in Italy